Chiseldon Camp Halt was a small railway station on the Midland and South Western Junction Railway line, south of Swindon in Wiltshire, England.

History

Chiseldon village was provided with a station when the line opened as the Swindon, Marlborough and Andover Railway in 1881, and during the First World War a long siding was built from the station to the military camp at Draycot Foliat.

In 1930, with the M&SWJR having been taken over by the Great Western Railway and with greater competition from road transport, a halt was opened on the main line itself about half a mile from the camp. The station was a single platform with a shelter, and it was unstaffed and run from Chiseldon station.

In the Second World War the Americans were stationed in large numbers at the then-named Chiseldon Camp and the line was extensively used for military transportation, as it linked the Midlands to the south. But traffic on the M&SWJR fell steeply after the War and the line closed to passengers in 1961, with goods facilities withdrawn from this section of the line at the same time. No trace of the station now remains;  the rail route is part of the National Cycle Network.

Route

Sources
 Wiltshire Railway Stations, Mike Oakley, Dovecote Press, Wimborne, 2004,

References

Disused railway stations in Wiltshire
Former Great Western Railway stations
Railway stations in Great Britain opened in 1930
Railway stations in Great Britain closed in 1961